More Than Music is the second studio album by Canadian recording artist Promise, it was released on August 8, 2008. The album features guest appearances from Elzhi (of Slum Village), Shad K, Royce Da 5'9" and others. The album was released by independent record label DFS Records.

Track listing

Personnel
 Executive producers: Dan Johnson
 Co-executive producers: Andrew James and Promise Shepherd
 Recording and mixing: Dan Johnson
 Mastering: Sterling Sound Mastering, New York
 Photography: Reesee, Zigga Zagga
 Art Direction and Design: Joel Johnson

Awards
 2009 CGMA Covenant Award winner for "Rap/Hip-Hop Album of the Year".

References

2012 albums
Promise (rapper) albums